The 2013–14 Sultan Qaboos Cup was the 41st edition of the Sultan Qaboos Cup, the premier knockout tournament for football teams in Oman.

The competition began on 4 November 2013 with the qualification round and concluded on 24 May 2014. Al-Suwaiq Club were the defending champions, having won their second title in 2013. On Saturday 24 May 2014, Fanja SC were crowned the champions of the 2013-14 Sultan Qaboos Cup when they defeated, Al-Nahda Club 2-0, hence winning the title for the record ninth time.

Teams
This year the tournament had 38 teams.

 Ahli Sidab Club (Sidab)
 Al-Bashaer Club 
 Al-Hamra SC (Al-Hamra)
 Al-Ittifaq Club
 Al-Ittihad Club (Salalah)
 Al-Kamel Wa Al-Wafi SC 
 Al-Khaboora SC (Al-Khaboora)
 Al-Mudhaibi SC (Mudhaibi)
 Al-Musannah SC (Al-Musannah)
 Al-Nahda Club (Al-Buraimi)
 Al-Nasr S.C.S.C. (Salalah)
 Al-Oruba SC (Sur)
 Al-Rustaq SC (Rustaq)
 Al-Seeb Club (Seeb)
 Al-Shabab Club (Seeb)
 Al-Suwaiq Club (Suwaiq
 Al-Tali'aa SC (Sur)
 Al-Wahda SC (Sur)
 Bahla Club (Bahla)
 Bowsher Club (Bawshar)
 Dhofar S.C.S.C. (Salalah)
 Dibba Club (Dibba Al-Baya)
 Fanja SC (Fanja)
 Ibri Club (Ibri)
 Ja'lan SC (Jalan Bani Bu Ali)
 Khasab SC (Khasab)
 Masirah SC (Majees)
 Majees SC (Majees)
 Mirbat SC (Mirbat)
 Muscat Club (Muscat)
 Nizwa Club (Nizwa)
 Oman Club (Muscat)
 Saham SC (Saham)
 Salalah SC (Salalah)
 Samail SC (Samail)
 Sohar SC (Sohar)
 Sur SC (Sur)
 Yanqul SC (Yanqul)

Qualification round
12 teams played a knockout tie. 6 ties were played over one leg. The first match was played between Ahli Sidab Club and Dibba Club on 4 November 2013. Ahli Sidab Club, Al-Hamra SC, Al-Rustaq SC, Al-Bashaer Club, Bahla Club and Ja’lan SC advanced to the Round of 32 after winning their respective ties.

Round of 32
32 teams played a knockout tie. 16 ties were played over one leg. The first match played was between Al-Kamel wa Al-Wafi SC and Oman Club on 21 November 2013. 16 teams advanced to the Round of 16.

Round of 16
16 teams played a knockout tie. 8 ties were played over one leg. The first match was played between Dhofar S.C.S.C. and Al-Shabab Club on 5 December 2013. 8 teams advanced to the Quarterfinals.

Quarterfinals
8 teams played a knockout tie. 4 ties were played over two legs. The first match was played between Fanja SC and Nizwa Club on 8 February 2014. Fanja SC, Dhofar S.C.S.C., Bowsher Club and Al-Nahda Club qualified for the Semifinals.

1st Legs

2nd Legs

Semifinals
4 teams played a knockout tie. 2 ties were played over two legs. The first match was played between Al-Nahda Club and Dhofar S.C.S.C. on 26 March 2014. Fanja SC and Al-Nahda Club qualified for the finals.

1st Legs

2nd Legs

Finals

References

External links
Oman Sultan Cup 2013-2014 at Soccerway.com
Oman Sultan Cup 2013-2014 at Goalzz.com
Oman Sultan Cup 2013-2014 Round of 32-Al-Ittihad 1-1 Al-Oruba (Penalty Shootout)
Oman Sultan Cup 2013-2014 Round of 32-Al-Shabab 0-0 Sur (Penalty Shootout)
Oman Sultan Cup 2013-2014 Round of 32-Fanja 1-0 Saham
Oman Sultan Cup 2013-2014 Round of 16-Dhofar 4-0 Al-Shabab
Oman Sultan Cup 2013-2014 Round of 16-Al-Wahda 1-6 Fanja
Oman Sultan Cup 2013-2014 Round of 16-Al-Nahda 3-1 Al-Musannah
Oman Sultan Cup 2013-2014 Round of 16-Salalah 0-2 Al-Nasr
Oman Sultan Cup 2013-2014 Round of 16-Al-Ittihad 1-4 Sohar
Oman Sultan Cup 2013-2014 Round of 16-Bowsher 2-1 Al-Mudhaibi
Oman Sultan Cup 2013-2014 Quarterfinals-Fanja 2-0 Nizwa
Oman Sultan Cup 2013-2014 Quarterfinals-Muscat 0-2 Dhofar
Oman Sultan Cup 2013-2014 Quarterfinals-Sohar 1-4 Al-Nahda
Oman Sultan Cup 2013-2014 Finals-Fanja 2-0 Al-Nahda

Sultan Qaboos Cup seasons
Cup
Cup